Back-fire is an unintended explosion produced in a vehicle's engine.

Backfire may also refer to:

Film and television
 Backfire (1926 film), part of the Ton of Fun series
Backfire (1950 film), featuring Virginia Mayo and Gordon Macrae
Backfire (1962 film), an entry in the Edgar Wallace Mysteries film series
Backfire (1964 film), starring Jean-Paul Belmondo and Jean Seberg
Backfire (1988 film), a movie starring Karen Allen
Backfire! (1995 film), a 1995 spoof movie starring Josh Mosby, Telly Savalas (final role) and Robert Mitchum
Backfire, a 2019 American crime drama film directed and written by Dave Patten
"Backfire" (CSI: Miami), an episode of the TV show CSI:Miami
Backfire, a recurring segment on The Daily Show, 1996-1998
"Backfire" (Dexter's Laboratory), an episode of Dexter's Laboratory

Other uses
Backfire, NATO reporting name for the Soviet and Russian Tupolev Tu-22M long-range bomber
Operation Backfire (WWII), the launch of three A4 rockets in October 1945 near Cuxhaven
Operation Backfire (FBI), an FBI operation against the radical environmental movement
In economics, in the Jevons paradox, when the rebound effect exceeds 100%
Backfire (album), by the Goa trance group Transwave
Backfire (Transformers), a fictional character
Controlled burn or backfire, a firefighting technique
An alcoholic cocktail made of Bailey's Irish Cream, Kahlúa, and vodka in equal portions
Version 10.03 of the OpenWrt firmware
The backfire effect, a phenomenon in psychology
An occurrence of unintended consequences that are the opposite of the intended result, or detrimental (the "perverse result")